Sandy Valley is the southeastern most unincorporated community, in Inyo County, California, located in the Mesquite Valley. The population in the 2020 for sandy valley is in census tract 8, Block 1330–1333 was of 4.

History
In 2011, Sandy Valley was considered as an alternative site for the Hidden Hills Solar Electric Generation System,

Economy
Sandy Valley's economy is predominately based on the cultivation of marijuana, and turf for residential use.

Government

In the Inyo County board of Supervisors, Sandy valley is in District 5, represented by Supervisor Matt Kingsley.

In the State Legislator, Sandy Valley is in the 8th senate district, represented by Republican Andreas Borgeas

References

Unincorporated communities in California
Populated places in the Mojave Desert
Unincorporated communities in Inyo County, California